Reuben Woolhouse (25 November 1904 – 1986) was an English professional footballer who played as an outside left.

Career
Born in Birmingham, Woolhouse spent his early career with Ecclesfield United, Birmingham, Southend United and Loughborough Corinthians. He signed for Bradford City from Loughborough Corinthians in May 1930. He made 26 league appearances for the club, scoring 5 goals, before joining Coventry City in July 1932. He later played for Walsall and Swindon Town.

Sources

References

1904 births
Date of death missing
Footballers from Sheffield
English footballers
Ecclesfield United F.C. players
Birmingham City F.C. players
Southend United F.C. players
Loughborough Corinthians F.C. players
Bradford City A.F.C. players
Coventry City F.C. players
Walsall F.C. players
Swindon Town F.C. players
English Football League players
Association football outside forwards